Sven Demandt (born 13 February 1965) is a German football coach and former player.

Honours
 2. Bundesliga top scorer: 1989 (35 goals)

References

External links

https://www.fupa.net/spieler/sven-demandt-41172.html Sven Demandt] at FuPa

Living people
1965 births
Association football forwards
German footballers
German football managers
Fortuna Düsseldorf players
Bayer 04 Leverkusen players
Hertha BSC players
1. FSV Mainz 05 players
FC Viktoria Köln players
1. FC Union Solingen managers
Bundesliga players
2. Bundesliga players
3. Liga managers
Rot-Weiss Essen non-playing staff
Footballers from Cologne
West German footballers